Belarusian National Technical University (BNTU) is the major technical university in Belarus.

History 
 1920 — establishment of Belarusian State Polytechnic Institute on the basis of a Minsk Polytechnic school.
 1922 — reorganised in Belarusian State Institute of Agriculture.
 1933 — Belarusian Polytechnic Institute after adjunction of Horki Institute of Land Amelioration and Minsk Institutions of Peat, Chemical Engineering, Civil Engineering, Electrical Engineering and Food Industry.
 1991 — Belarusian State Polytechnic Academy.
 1997 — granted a leading engineering educational institution status in Belarusian educational system.
 2002 — Belarusian National Technical University.

Faculties 
 Automotive and Tractor
 Mining Engineering and Engineering Ecology
 Mechanical Engineering
 Mechanics and Technology
 Marketing, Management and Entrepreneurship
 Power Engineering
 Information Technologies and Robotics
 Management Technologies and Humanitarization
 Soligorsk branch
 Engineering and Pedagogy
 Power Plant Construction and Engineering Services
 Architectural
 Civil Engineering
 Instrumentation Engineering
 Transport Communications
 Military and Technical
 Sports and Technical
 International Institute of Distance Education

Notable alumni
Vyacheslav Kebich, Prime-Minister of Belarus (1991–1994)
Gennady Novitsky, Prime-Minister of Belarus (2001–2003)
Gennadi Gagulia, Prime-Minister of Abkhazia (1995–1997, 2002–2003, 2018)

References

External links

 Official Website
University news
i.bntu.by – Applicant Navigator

Universities in Minsk
Universities and institutes established in the Soviet Union
Educational institutions established in 1920
1920 establishments in Belarus